Flesh of My Flesh, Blood of My Blood is the second album by American rapper DMX. The album was released on December 22, 1998, by Def Jam Recordings Music Group Inc. and Ruff Ryders, a little more than seven months after his debut album, It's Dark and Hell Is Hot. It entered the charts at number 1 (and stayed there for three consecutive weeks) with over 670,000 units shipped in the first week. The album eventually went 3× platinum in the US.

DMX became the second rapper to have two albums released in the same calendar year debut at number one on the Billboard 200. The latter album to have done so was released posthumously by Tupac Shakur under the alias Makaveli.

Track listing
Credits adapted from the album's liner notes.

Notes
 "Bring Your Whole Crew" contains additional vocals by Anthony "PK" Fields.
 "Ain't No Way", "Flesh of My Flesh, Blood of My Blood" and "Heat" contain additional vocals by Swizz Beatz.
 "Slippin'" contains additional vocals by Tamyra Gray.

Sample credits
 "It's All Good" contains a sample of "Heartbeat", written and performed by Taana Gardner.
 "The Omen" contains an interpolation of "Damien", written by Earl Simmons and Damon Blackman.
 "Slippin'" contains a sample of "Moonstreams", written and performed by Grover Washington Jr.

Charts

Weekly charts

Year-end charts

Certifications

See also
 List of Billboard 200 number-one albums of 1999
 List of Billboard number-one R&B albums of 1999

References

1998 albums
DMX (rapper) albums
Albums produced by Dame Grease
Albums produced by Irv Gotti
Albums produced by Swizz Beatz
Hardcore hip hop albums
Ruff Ryders Entertainment albums